Alces is a genus of moose or elk. It is also the state animal of Alaska, as of May 1, 1998

Alces may also refer to:

Biology
Alces alces, the binomial species name for the Eurasian Elk, also known as the Moose in North America.
 Alces (journal), a scientific journal devoted to the biology and management of Alces alces
 Canis lupus alces, a species of gray wolf
 Campylomormyrus alces, a species of electric fish

 Geography
 Alces River, a tributary of the Peace River in Canada
 Alces Lake, a lake in Whiteswan Lake Provincial Park, Canada

 Other
Alces, in Greek Myth, one of the Sons of Aegyptus
 Alces Minor, a fictional star in the Dune series

See also

 Alcis (disambiguation)